MacVector is a commercial sequence analysis application for Apple Macintosh computers running Mac OS X. It is intended to be used by molecular biologists to help analyze, design, research and document their experiments in the laboratory. MacVector 18.1 is a Universal Binary capable of running on Intel and Apple Silicon Macs.

Features 
MacVector is a collection of sequence analysis algorithms linked to various sequence editors, including a single sequence editor, a multiple sequence alignment editor and a contig editor.  MacVector tries to use a minimum of windows and steps to access all the functionality. Functions include:

 Sequence alignment (ClustalW, Muscle and T-Coffee) and editing.
 Subsequence search and open reading frames (ORFs) analysis.
 Phylogenetic tree construction UPGMA, Neighbour joining with bootstrapping and consensus trees
 Online Database searching - Search public databases at the NCBI such as Genbank, PubMed, and UniProt.
 Perform online BLAST searches.
 Protein analysis.
 Contig assembly and chromatogram editing
 Aligning cDNA against genomic templates
 Creating dot plots of DNA to DNA, Protein to Protein and DNA to protein.
 Restriction analysis - find and view restriction cut sites. Uses digested fragments to clone genes into vectors. Stores a history of digested fragments allowing multi fragment ligations.
 PCR Primer design - easy primer design and testing. Also uses primer3
 Agarose Gel simulation.
 CRISPR INDEL analysis.

MacVector has a contig assembly plugin called Assembler that uses phred, phrap, Bowtie, SPAdes, Velvet and cross match.

As of version 13.0.1 MacVector uses Sparkle for updating between releases.

History 

MacVector was originally developed by IBI in 1994. It was acquired by Kodak, and subsequently Oxford Molecular in 1996. Oxford Molecular was merged into Accelrys in 2001. It was acquired by MacVector, Inc on 1 January 2007.

References

External links 
MacVector homepage

Bioinformatics software
Computational science